The Franklin Square Union Free School District is a pre kindergarten to 6th grade elementary school district located in Franklin Square, New York in Nassau County Long Island.  Its students are enrolled in three elementary schools, John Street School, Polk Street School and Washington Street School, with Washington Street School having the highest test rates in the district.

The district feeds into the Sewanhaka Central High School District, which has five high schools. Most Franklin Square students continue their education at H. Frank Carey Junior/Senior High School, though it is possible for students to attend one of the other schools in the high school district and a slight minority of students in the district does go to Sewanhaka CHSD but most do go to Carey. Some catholic students that do not want to go to Carey do go to Kellenberg Memorial High School but most go to Carey.

St. Catherine of Siena Catholic School, of the Roman Catholic Diocese of Rockville Centre, was scheduled to close in 2012, so the Franklin Square UFSD no longer needed to transport students to and from that school. FSUFSD superintendent Patrick Manley anticipated that his district would gain 39 students from the closure.

References

External links 
 

School districts in New York (state)
Education in Nassau County, New York